Tarbes–Lourdes–Pyrénées Airport is an airport 9 km south-southwest of Tarbes in the Hautes-Pyrénées département of France.

Operations

It handles scheduled and charter flights from across Europe, with many passengers being Catholic pilgrims journeying to nearby Lourdes. The airport can handle large aircraft such as the Boeing 747.

Airlines and destinations

The following airlines operate regular scheduled and charter flights to and from the airport:

Statistics

References

Bibliography

External links

Tarbes–Lourdes–Pyrénées Airport (official site)
Aéroport de Tarbes–Lourdes–Pyrénées (Union des Aéroports Français) 

Airports in Occitania (administrative region)
Airport
Buildings and structures in Hautes-Pyrénées
Airports established in 1948